Yosef Goldschmidt (born 1907, died 25 July 1981) was an Israeli politician who served as a member of the Knesset for the National Religious Party between 1969 and 1974.

Biography
Born in Frankfurt am Main, Goldschmidt was educated at a yeshiva, and studied at Goethe University Frankfurt, the Ludwig Maximilian University of Munich and the University of London. He was certified as a high school biology, chemistry and geography teacher.

In 1935 he made aliyah to Mandatory Palestine, where he worked as a teacher. Between 1942 and 1948 he was a schools supervisor, before becoming a supervisor of the Mizrachi school network. In 1952 he was appointed deputy director general of the Ministry of Education and Culture, becoming director of the religious education Section the following year, remaining in post until 1968.

Goldschmidt was on the National Religious Party list for the 1969 elections. Although he failed to win a seat, he entered the Knesset on 15 December that year as a replacement for Yosef Burg, who had resigned his seat after being given a ministerial post. Goldschmidt himself was made Deputy Minister of Internal Affairs. However, he lost his seat in the 1973 elections.

In 1974 he became Deputy Mayor of Jerusalem. He died in July 1981.

References

External links
 

1907 births
1981 deaths
Alumni of the University of London
Deputy Mayors of Jerusalem
Deputy ministers of Israel
Jewish emigrants from Nazi Germany to Mandatory Palestine
Goethe University Frankfurt alumni
Israeli civil servants
Israeli educators
Ludwig Maximilian University of Munich alumni
Members of the 7th Knesset (1969–1974)
National Religious Party politicians
Politicians from Frankfurt
German schoolteachers